The Panasonic Globe Theatre in Tokyo, Japan, was designed by Isozaki Arata and  opened in 1988 to showcase local and international productions of Shakespeare's plays. Guest companies and artists have included the British Royal National Theatre, Royal Shakespeare Company, Shakespeare's Globe Theatre, Ingmar Bergman, Peter Brook, Barry Kyle and Robert Lepage, as well as such Kabuki stars as Bando Tamasaburo (Lady Macbeth), and Ichikawa Somegoro (Kabuki Hamlet).

External links
 Tokyo Globe Theatre (Japanese only)

Theatres in Tokyo
Buildings and structures in Shinjuku
Arata Isozaki buildings
Theatres completed in 1988
Panasonic
1988 establishments in Japan